Anthony Gerald Lanigan  (born 1947) is a New Zealand civil engineer. He was the first chancellor of Auckland University of Technology from 2000 to 2001, and a founding director in New Zealand of the international charity, Habitat for Humanity.

Background
Lanigan spent his childhood in Auckland. He came from a strong Catholic family, in Northcote, and was educated at St Peter's College where he was joint proxime accessit  in 1965 and at the University of Auckland where he obtained a PhD in engineering in 1975. His research into the prediction of thermal stress conditions in box girder bridges stemmed from post construction problems with the Newmarket Viaduct. His research yielded a design approach for accommodating solar-induced thermal loads on civil engineering structures. Lanigan had a strong social justice ethos from his student days at Auckland University where he was involved in demonstrating against the Vietnam war, apartheid and nuclear arms. He also worked with the Daughters of Charity to establish De Paul House in Northcote. Tony and his wife Krys Lanigan are members of St Marys Catholic Parish in Northcote, Auckland.

Professional career
A civil engineer, Lanigan was Engineering Director for Babbage Partners and later, Technology Director for Fletcher Challenge Building Industries Group and Buildings Project Sector, General Manager of Information Services for the Fletcher Construction Company and General Manager of Fletcher Project Services. Lanigan is principal of AG Lanigan and Associates Ltd. He holds Directorships in several private companies, was a foundation Trustee, and is the chairman, of New Zealand Housing Foundation (a not-for-profit, charitable trust delivering affordable home ownership for low income households) and has served with other charitable trusts. He was Director of Infrastructure Auckland for five years, 2000–2004. Lanigan was a director of Inframax Construction Ltd and a member of the advisory board of GHD New Zealand Ltd. In 2011 he is a member of the board of the NZ Transport Agency.

Auckland University of Technology
He was appointed to the council of the Auckland Institute of Technology in 1996 and from February 1999 until the end of that year, he was the chairman of that body. He was Chancellor of the Auckland University of Technology in 2000-2001 (the first chancellor of the new university), where he was also a founding Trustee 1998–2001.

Habitat for Humanity
A telephone call in 1992 from Dr Michael Powell, a Kiwi who had lived in the United States, invited Lanigan to meet with him and Ian Hay to start Habitat for Humanity New Zealand.  A foundation Director of Habitat for Humanity New Zealand from 2003, Lanigan was appointed as Chairman in 2004. He was elected as Vice Chairman of the Habitat for Humanity International Board of Directors in 2007. As the Vice Chair of the International Board, Lanigan is responsible for International Programmes which help in excess of 60,000 families per year with their housing needs. As part of these international responsibilities, in 2009, he visited Jogjakarta in Indonesia where 150 houses were dedicated after a major earthquake and handed over to their owners. Lanigan feels that his work for Habitation for Humanity is personally rewarding for its ecumenical involvement. He feels that it is faith in action, walking the talk. To Lanigan, true faith must be expressed practically. It must be worked out.

Good Shepherd College
In 2012, Lanigan was appointed as chairman of the Good Shepherd College Senate.

Honours
In the 2013 New Year Honours, Lanigan was appointed a Member of the New Zealand Order of Merit for services to tertiary education and the community.

References

1947 births
Living people
New Zealand people of Irish descent
New Zealand businesspeople
New Zealand civil engineers
University of Auckland alumni
People educated at St Peter's College, Auckland
New Zealand Roman Catholics
Members of the New Zealand Order of Merit
Habitat for Humanity people